Naas North is a barony in County Kildare, Republic of Ireland.

Etymology
Naas North derives its name from the town of Naas (Irish Nás na Ríogh, "assembly-place of the kings").

Location

Naas North barony is located in northeast County Kildare, south and east of the Liffey.

History
These were part of the ancient lands of the Uí Broin (O'Byrnes) before the 13th century, retaken in the 14th. The Uí Ceallaig Cualann (O'Kelly) were also noted early in the eastern section. An Uí Fhionáin (O'Finan) sept is noted in the north part of this barony. There was originally a single Naas barony, divided into north and south baronies before 1603.

List of settlements

Below is a list of settlements in Naas North:
Eadestown
Naas
Rathmore
Sallins

References

Baronies of County Kildare